The Michigan Senate is the upper house of the Michigan Legislature. Along with the Michigan House of Representatives, it composes the state legislature, which has powers, roles and duties defined by Article IV of the Michigan Constitution, adopted in 1963. The primary purpose of the Legislature is to enact new laws and amend or repeal existing laws.

The Michigan Senate is composed of 38 members, each elected from a single-member district with a population of between approximately 212,400 to 263,500 residents. Legislative districts are drawn on the basis of population figures, provided by the federal decennial census. In January 2023, Democrats took the majority with 20 seats to Republicans' 18 seats. The Senate chamber is located in the State Capitol building.

Titles
Members of the Michigan Senate are called senators. Because this shadows the terminology used to describe members of the United States Senate, constituents and the news media, using The Associated Press Stylebook, often refer to members of the Michigan Senate as state senators when necessary to avoid confusion with their federal counterparts.

Terms
Senators are elected on a partisan basis for four-year terms, concurrent with the election of the Governor of Michigan. Terms for senators begin on January 1 at noon, following the November general election and end on January 1 when their replacements are sworn in.

Senate elections are always held two years after the election for President of the United States, with the next election scheduled for November 3, 2026.

Term limits
On November 3, 1992, almost 59 percent of Michigan voters backed Proposal B, the Michigan Term Limits Amendment, which amended the state constitution, to enact term limits on federal and state officials. In 1995, the U.S. Supreme Court ruled that states could not enact congressional term limits, but ruled that the state-level term limits remain. Under the amendment, a person could be elected to the state senate two times. A provision governing partial terms was also included. These provisions became Article IV, section 54 and Article V, section 30 of the Michigan Constitution. On November 8, 2022, nearly 2 in 3 voters approved Proposal 1, further limiting state legislators to 12 years combined in either chamber of the legislature, but incumbent senators re-elected in 2022 would remain eligible for their new terms even if it pushed them over the 12-year limit.

Qualifications
Each senator must be a citizen of the United States, at least 21 years of age, and an elector of the district they represent. Under state law, moving out of the district shall be deemed a vacation of the office. No person who has been convicted of subversion or who has within the preceding 20 years been convicted of a felony involving a breach of public trust shall be eligible for either house of the legislature.

Legislative session
For reckoning periods of time during which the legislature operates, each two-year period coinciding with the election of new members of the House of Representatives is numbered consecutively as a legislature, dating to the first legislature following Michigan's admission as a state. The current two-year term of the legislature (January 1, 2021 – December 31, 2022) is the 101st Legislature.

Each year during which the legislature meets constitutes a new legislative session. According to Article IV Section 13 of the State Constitution, a new session of the legislature begins when the members of each house convene, on the second Wednesday of January every year at noon. A regular session of the legislature typically lasts throughout the entire year with several periods of recess and adjourns sine die in late December.

The Michigan legislature is one of ten full-time state legislative bodies in the United States. Members receive a base salary of $71,685 per year, which makes them the fourth-highest paid state legislators in the country, after California, Pennsylvania and New York. While legislators in many states receive per diems that make up for lower salaries, Michigan legislators receive $10,800 per year for session and interim expenses. Salaries and expense allowances are determined by the State Officers Compensation Commission.

Any legislation pending in either chamber at the end of a session that is not the end of a legislative term of office continues and carries over to the next legislative session.

Powers and process
The Michigan legislature is authorized by the Michigan Constitution to create and amend the laws of the U.S. state of Michigan, subject to the governor's power to veto legislation. To do so, legislators propose legislation in the forms of bills drafted by a nonpartisan, professional staff. Successful legislation must undergo committee review, three readings on the floor of each house, with appropriate voting majorities, as required, and either be signed into law by the governor or enacted through a veto override approved by two-thirds of the membership of each legislative house.

Composition

Leadership
The Michigan Senate is headed by the Lieutenant Governor of Michigan, who serves as President of the Senate but may cast a vote only in the instance of a tie. The presiding officers of the senate, apart from the president, are elected by the body at its first session and serve until their term of office is up. Majority and minority party officers are elected at the same time by their respective caucuses.

The senate majority leader controls the assignment of committees and leadership positions, along with control of the agenda in the chamber.

 President: Garlin Gilchrist (D)
 President Pro Tempore: Jeremy Moss (D)
 Majority Leader: Winnie Brinks (D)
 Assistant President Pro Tempore: Erika Geiss (D)
 Associate President Pro Tempore of the Michigan Senate: Joe Bellino (R)
 Assistant Majority Leader: Darrin Camilleri (D)
 Majority Floor Leader: Sam Singh (D)
 Assistant Majority Floor Leaders: Jeff Irwin, Kristen McDonald Rivet (D)
 Majority Caucus Chairperson: Dayna Polehanki (D)
 Assistant Majority Caucus Chairperson: Veronica Klinefelt (D)
 Majority Whip: Mallory McMorrow (D)
 Assistant Majority Whip: Mary Cavanagh (D)
 Minority Leader of the Michigan Senate: Aric Nesbitt (R)
 Assistant Minority Leader: Rick Outman (R)
 Minority Floor Leader: Dan Lauwers (R)
 Assistant Minority Floor Leader: Lana Theis (R)
 Minority Caucus Chair: Kevin Daley (R)
 Assistant Minority Caucus Chair: Jim Runestad (R)
 Minority Whip: Roger Victory (R)
 Assistant Minority Whip: Mark Huizenga (R)

Members, 2023–2026

Past composition of the Senate

See also
Government of Michigan
Michigan Legislature
Michigan State Capitol
Michigan House of Representatives
Michigan Republican Party
Michigan Democratic Party
Lieutenant Governor of Michigan
List of majority leaders of the Michigan Senate
Michigan Senate elections:
2002
2006
2010
2014
2018
2022

References

External links
 Michigan Senate
 Republican Party Caucus, Michigan Senate
 Democratic Party Caucus, Michigan Senate

 
State upper houses in the United States
Government of Michigan
Lansing, Michigan